Wellesbourne is a large village in the civil parish of Wellesbourne and Walton, in the county of Warwickshire, in the West Midlands region of the UK. In the 2021 census the parish, which also includes the hamlet of Walton, had a population of 7,283, a significant increase from 5,849 In the 2011 census. The civil parish was renamed from Wellesbourne to Wellesbourne and Walton on 1 April 2014.

With the rapid increase in new housing and industrial developments since the 1990s, Wellesbourne is increasingly referred to as a small commuter town servicing its larger neighbours such as Stratford-upon-Avon, Warwick, Leamington Spa and Banbury, and a little further afield, the cities of Coventry and Birmingham.

Wellesbourne sits on the A429 road, and is located around seven miles south of Warwick and five miles east of Stratford-upon-Avon. Nearby villages include Loxley, Hampton Lucy, Charlecote, Walton and Kineton.

History

The name was first recorded in 862 as Wallesburam. It was later referred to as Waleborne in the Domesday Book.

In May 1140 Wellesbourne was hit by a tornado – one of the earliest recorded in the British Isles. It damaged several buildings and killed a woman.

Wellesbourne was once two villages – Wellesbourne Mountford and Wellesbourne Hastings, the two villages being divided by the River Dene; the former lying to the south of the river, and the latter to the north. In 1947 the two parishes were merged, and are now considered to be a single village. For these historical reasons Wellesbourne has two village centres, Chestnut Square and the Precinct respectively. The Chestnut Square area no longer contains commercial premises but the old shop fronts are visible in what are now houses.

Wellesbourne Hall, dating from about 1700 and grade 2* listed, was owned by the Dewes (later Granville) family for nearly two centuries until 1920.

Perhaps the most significant event in Wellesbourne's history was the founding in 1872 of the National Agricultural Labourers Union by Joseph Arch – an event once celebrated by an annual parade, which it was hoped to be revived in 2010. There was little interest from the Trade Unions which once featured quite prominently, but the Wellesbourne Action Group still organises a walk from Barford to Wellesbourne around 9 June each year along the Joseph Arch Way. There is a somewhat unusual memorial in the form of a plaque in the village bus shelter dating from 1952. The initial meetings were held in the historic Stag's Head pub, which the bus shelter is located opposite. The thatched building was built in 1640 and became a pub in 1830. It was devastated by fire in 2021, but following extensive restoration was reopened a year later. The King's Head on Warwick Road is the village's only other pub.

During World War II the Royal Air Force opened an airfield; RAF Wellesbourne Mountford immediately south of the village, after the war this was converted into a civilian airfield.

Since the 1960s new housing developments have meant that Wellesbourne has grown significantly. In the 1980s 800 houses were built on the Dovehouse estate, this was built on part of the site of the airfield and the streets are named after the aircraft which once flew from there.

Features

Just outside the village is Warwick Crop Centre which is part of The University of Warwick. Originally this was one of the sites of the UK Government run Horticulture Research International, and before that it was known as the Institute of Horticultural Research and, before that, the National Vegetable Research Station.

The needs and wants of the people of Wellesbourne and Walton are under periodic review, particularly housing and recreation facilities. A survey was undertaken in 2010 resulting in a new Plan. Vision for Wellesbourne was part of this, and set up a website to marshal ideas, but this has now run its course and been allowed to lapse. A proposal, put forward by Commercial Estates Group (CEG) to build 175 houses on land off Ettington Road has been picked up by the firm Charles Church, and work started in January 2013. Work is also underway to bring back the Football/ Recreation Centre which has fallen into disrepair.

In July 2012 two more websites associated with Wellesbourne were formed: Wellesbourne and Walton News now appears on its own site, provided by St Peter's Church; My Wellesbourne is in the form of a blog, to appeal to a younger audience, and Wellesbourne's Facebook page, though not new, was given more publicity and prominence.

Wellesbourne gained publicity when Chedham's Yard, a historic agricultural building featuring a blacksmith's and wheelwright's workshops, won BBC TV's Restoration Village competition in 2006. The Yard has undergone restoration work and a new visitor centre has been built; it opened in April 2012 with a schedule of weekend visits.

Wellesbourne Industrial Estate is also located within the village near to the A429. In November 2012 there was a plan to turn it into Loxley Park with new industrial units and housing, and a Sainsbury's supermarket, which is the same size as the one at Kenilworth, opened in May 2015.

Airfield
There is a small airfield called Wellesbourne Mountford Airfield, also the site of a large market held every Saturday and bank holiday Mondays.

The airfield hosts a Wings and Wheels event each year. In 2009 the event took place on 19 August and featured Avro Vulcan XH558, Avro Vulcan XM655, Red Arrows (with Avro Vulcan XM655 being the star of the show) and a number of classic vehicles and military vehicles. Events have taken place in June since 2010 including 21 June 2015 and 19 June 2016. 2014 celebrated the 50th anniversary of XM655 having been delivered to the RAF and the 30th anniversary of the aircraft's delivery to Wellesbourne.

There is also a wartime Museum which includes a number of aircraft and a wartime emergency underground bunker.

Churches

There are two churches in Wellesbourne, St. Peter's parish church and the Methodist church.

Schools

Wellesbourne is home to Wellesbourne Church of England primary school.

Sport 

Wellesbourne plays a variety of sports via established clubs, notably in football (in which Wellesbourne Wanderers FC have won several awards in recent years), cricket and rugby. Wellesbourne also has a badminton club, based at Kineton School (Wellesbourne Badminton Club).

Politics

Following a Boundary Change most of Wellesbourne is now in the Parliamentary Constituency of Kenilworth and Southam. Two roads, Hammond Green and Ramsay Green built west of the old Parish Boundary are still attached to Stratford.

Climate

References

External links

Wellesbourne and Walton Parish Council website
History of the National Vegetable Research Station
My Wellesbourne
Photos of Wellesbourne and surrounding area on geograph.org.uk
St Peter's Church website
Wellesbourne Action Group website
Wellesbourne and Walton News
Wellesbourne Badminton Club
Wellesbourne CofE Primary School website
Wellesbourne Cricket Club website
Wellesbourne Facebook page
Wellesbourne RFC website
Wellesbourne Village website (New, under development)
Wellesbourne Village website (Old, frozen)
Wellesbourne Wanderers FC website
Wellesbourne Photo Group

Villages in Warwickshire
Stratford-on-Avon District